Domenico Meldolesi (12 January 1940 – 3 January 1992) was an Italian racing cyclist. He won stage 10 of the 1965 Giro d'Italia.

References

External links
 

1940 births
1992 deaths
Italian male cyclists
Italian Giro d'Italia stage winners
Place of birth missing
Sportspeople from the Province of Ravenna
Cyclists from Emilia-Romagna